KVMX-FM (92.1 FM) is a radio station licensed to Placerville, California, United States, and serving the Sacramento area with a Ranchera format, branded as "La Ranchera". The station is currently owned by Lotus Communications, who bought the then-KMJE from Results Radio on September 3, 2013 and took over ownership on December 10, 2013. It is also broadcasting on AM at 890, known as KVMX, which signed on as KMJE in the summer of 2014.

History
KMJE programmed a Spanish AC format as Vive 92.1 which debuted on December 10, 2013 with Spanish Holiday music programming upon its launch under new owners Lotus. KVMX-FM in the past featured various programming formats, which are listed below starting with the last format first:

KCCL played classic hits (known as K-HITS) from the 1960s, 1970s and 1980s and every song is a hit from those decades from January 5, 2007 to May 29, 2013, when it swapped places with KMJE (who moved from 101.5) and began stunting with a loop directing listeners to KCCL's new home at 101.5, which lasted until July 1, 2013.
KXCL, aired a 1980s hits music format from August 1, 2005 - January 5, 2007, branded as "Flash 92.1".
KBDB, aired an adult hits music format from March 15, 2005 - August 1, 2005, branded as "Bob 92.1".
KREL, aired a country music format from November 17, 2003 - March 15, 2005, branded as "Real Country 92.1".

The station changed its call sign to KMJE-FM on August 12, 2014, in preparation for the launch of AM sister station KMJE. It changed its call sign back to KMJE on April 17, 2017, when its AM sister station changed its call sign to KVMX.

There was previously a KCCL at 101.9 FM which featured an oldies format. With studios in Sacramento and transmitter at Shingle Springs, this version of KCCL went on the air in the Spring of 2000. Known as "KOOL 101.9" and later as "BOSS 101.9," this station flipped to a modern country format (KNTY, "The Wolf") in the Spring of 2007. Three of the current airstaff, Joey Mitchell, Big Jim Hall, and Sweet Lou Gallagher were part of the staff at "KOOL 101.9" along with veteran personality Rick Shannon.

During the beginning of July 2017, KMJE dropped the Vive branding in favor of a Regional Mexican format under the name La Buena.

The station changed its call sign to KVMX-FM on March 1, 2019.

References

External links

VMX-FM
Radio stations established in 1983
Lotus Communications stations
1983 establishments in California
VMX-FM